Wanida Kotruang (born 29 June 1990 in Sakon Nakhon) is a Thai indoor volleyball player. She is a member of the Thailand women's national volleyball team.

Clubs 
  Nakhon Ratchasima (2009–2014)
  Smart-Maynilad Net Spikers (2013)
  Cagayan Valley Lady Rising Suns (2013)
  Bangkok Glass (2014–2018)

Awards

Individual 
 2013 PSL Grand Prix "Best Outside Spiker"

Clubs
 2009–10 Thailand League -  Bronze medal, with Nakhon Ratchasima
 2010–11 Thailand League -  Bronze medal, with Nakhon Ratchasima
 2012–13 Thailand League -  Bronze medal, with Nakhon Ratchasima
 2013 Shakey's V-League 10th Season Open Conference -  Silver medal, with Smart-Maynilad Net Spikers
 2013–2014 Thailand League -  Champion, with Nakhon Ratchasima
 2014 Thai-Denmark Super League -  Runner-Up, with Nakhon Ratchasima
 2014–2015 Thailand League -  Champion, with Bangkok Glass
 2015 Thai-Denmark Super League -  Champion, with Bangkok Glass
 2015 Asian Club Championship -  Champion, with Bangkok Glass
 2015–2016 Thailand League -  Champion, with Bangkok Glass
 2016 Thai-Denmark Super League -  Champion, with Bangkok Glass
 2016 Asian Club Championship -  place, with Bangkok Glass
 2016–17 Thailand League -  Runner-up, with Bangkok Glass
 2017 Thai-Denmark Super League -  Runner-up, with Bangkok Glass
 2017–18 Thailand League -  Third, with Bangkok Glass
 2018 Thai-Denmark Super League -  Runner-up, with Bangkok Glass

References

External links
 FIVB Biography

1990 births
Living people
Wanida Kotruang
Wanida Kotruang
Wanida Kotruang
Wanida Kotruang